Lakhanke Padde  is a village in Kapurthala district of Punjab State, India. The village is administrated by a Sarpanch, who is an elected representative.

Demography 
According to the report published by Census India in 2011, Lakhanke Padde has 778 houses with the total population of 3,830 persons of which 2,008 are male and 1,822 females. Literacy rate of  Lakhanke Padde is 72.88%, lower than the state average of 75.84%.  The population of children in the age group 0–6 years is 360 which is 9.40% of the total population.  Child sex ratio is approximately 989, higher than the state average of 846.

Population data

References

External links
  Villages in Kapurthala
 Kapurthala Villages List

Villages in Kapurthala district